The Mighty Peking Man (猩猩王) (Mandarin: Xīngxing Wáng – which translates to "Gorilla King" in English) is a 1977 giant monster film produced by Shaw Brothers Studio to capitalize on the craze surrounding the 1976 remake of King Kong. The film was originally released in the United States with the English dub in 1980 as Goliathon 

The film was directed by Ho Meng Hua and produced by Runme Shaw; the special effects were directed by Sadamasa Arikawa, with Koichi Kawakita as assistant FX director, who would move on to the Heisei Godzilla movies and the Heisei Mothra trilogy. It starred Danny Lee and Evelyne Kraft.

Plot 
Lu Tiem (Ku Feng) sees the Newspaper with His friends about the Giant Foot Print that was revealed in Himalayan India. The discovered nations were released as a past flashback, Utam the Mighty Peking Guy who destroys the buildings, throws rocks, and causes an earthquake-like rampage. They all chase him through the race. Lu deeds to send His Minion to torture Goliathon in any slights for destroying Indians. A party from Hong Kong, headed by Johnny (Danny Lee) are exploring the Indian side of the Himalayan mountains. They see the Himalayan people about the Gorilla what happened in the last year was revealed to destroy Himalayan villages. Johnny and friends meet all of the other animals like Bear, Monkey and Natures along with Buffalos and Gnus and fights the Elephants who are the Bodyguards of Utam that chase everyone and kill innocent people. The First Himalayan Elephant was shot and murdered by Johnny and chases, Lu Tiem has no doubt rose what happened Today. In the Morning, Tiger confronts Him and the mud comes. Johnny attacks it who bites Leg, Lu shots and chases. After Lu Tiem kills Him, Johnny assaults and punches him if his deeds are to takes down innocent people. Johnny sleeps while Lu and his friends retreat to the jungles and go back to China. He was left on his own and starts to become homeless and discovers the eponymous Peking Man, a Yeti, Utam Goliathon who battles him if he steps on the lines. Utam tries to kill Johnny's lifeless body, along with a beautiful blonde wild woman named Samantha (Evelyne Kraft) to tells Utam what to do that He stays away from taking down him before he was meant to be passed away by him in a poster. Johnny later to fights the Malayan Tiger but was chased by Samantha and seeing the Giant Leopard attacks him and was a friend of her whose parents had been killed in a plane crash. Samantha was raised by Utam (the Peking Man) with nothing to wear but animal skin bikini. Like Tarzan, she has learned both to swing through the trees on vines and to communicate with and command the jungle animals, with the exception of a venomous snake who bites her on the inner thigh, requiring the hero Johnny to suck out the poison while Samantha's leopard friend and the Giant Elephant attacks and battles the snake. Shortly thereafter, they fall in love.

Johnny and his partners bring Samantha and Utam to Hong Kong, where Utam goes on display to the incredulous public. While in Hong Kong, Samantha doesn't seem to prefer women's clothing and continues to wear her animal-skin bikini. Johnny, meanwhile, reconciles with the girlfriend whose romantic betrayal with his brother had been the impetus behind his sudden decision to explore the Himalayas. Samantha sees this and runs off and Lu Tiem confronts and punches Her that She stay away from Jungles. Utam goes wild to saves Her and kills Lu Tiem was now been here lies and gets revenge for killing Him (after the Tiger bites His Leg and chases). During Samantha's running, Utam ends up on a rampage. Utam then goes to the tallest building he can find (namely the Jardine House) and climbs it. Johnny and Samantha catch up to Utam and plan to get him out of Hong Kong and back to their jungle. Utam sacrifices and kills the Last Villain with several helicopters in a scene greatly reminiscent of the ending of Kong gets burned his body and falls off. Samantha is killed in an explosion during the conflict while Johnny receives a minor gunshot wound to the lower leg. then Utam crashed down the smaller building explodes and killed.

Cast 

 Danny Lee – Johnny Feng
 Evelyne Kraft – Samantha
 Katherine Murphy as Young Samantha
 Ku Feng – Lu Tien
 Lin Wei-tu – David Chen
 Norman Chui – Ah Lung
 Wu Hang-sheng – Ah Pi
 Hsiao Yao – Huang Tsui-Hua
 Chen Ping – Lin Chang
 Ted Thomas – Commissioner Theodore
 Steve Nicholson – Commissioner's aide
 Corey Yuen (uncredited)
 Keizo Murase – Utam (uncredited)

Production 
The Mighty Peking Man had a budget of six million Hong Kong dollars for the Shaw Bros. studio. The film took over a year to complete and was shot in Mysore, India. the miniatures were done by Cosmo Productions, everything from model cars, trucks, helicopters and buildings done by Murase himself. the design of the character Utam was made by brown fur originally white hair in the prototype, several scenes from man-in a suit and animatronic mask, close up puppet shots of the head, life size hands, legs. the climax filming the scene in top the Jardine House on the roof where Utam blown up by between takes, were poured by gas and was dangerous, and a stuffed dummy crashed the General Post office burns the set.

Release 
The Mighty Peking Man was distributed by Shaw Bros. in Hong Kong. Also in United States both released from March 19, 1980, by World Northal Pictures and re-released in April 23, 1999, by Rolling Thunder Pictures.

Reception 
Variety reviewed a 100-minute long Cantonese-language version of the film stating it was an "interesting if not unique Hongkong-made escapist entertainment for the inquisitive middle-of-the-roaders audience of other countries." and "it is high camp, Chinese style and for this reason it just might make it in less demanding markets."

In retrospective reviews, Roger Ebert gave the film three stars out of a possible four in the Chicago Sun-Times, and, incidentally, actually upgraded his rating for the thematically similar Infra-Man:"Mighty Peking Man is very funny, although a shade off the high mark of Infra-Man, which was made a year earlier, and is my favourite Hong Kong monster film. Both were produced by the legendary Runme Shaw, who, having tasted greatness, obviously hoped to repeat. I find to my astonishment that I gave Infra-Man only two and a half stars when I reviewed it. That was 22 years ago, but a fellow will remember a lot of things you wouldn't think he'd remember. I'll bet a month hasn't gone by since that I haven't thought of that film. I am awarding Mighty Peking Man three stars, for general goofiness and a certain level of insane genius, but I cannot in good conscience rate it higher than Infra-Man. So, in answer to those correspondents who ask if I have ever changed a rating on a movie: Yes, Infra-Man moves up to three stars.

Footnotes

References

External links 

Shaw Brothers Studio films
1977 films
Hong Kong horror films
1977 horror films
1970s adventure films
1970s monster movies
Films about apes
Giant monster films
Kaiju films
Films about Yeti
Films set in India
Films set in Hong Kong
Films directed by Ho Meng Hua
1970s Japanese films
1970s Hong Kong films